FK Slavoj Trebišov is a Slovak football team, based in the town of Trebišov. The club was founded in 1912. Club played Doxxbet liga in season 2014–2015. But they are relegated in the first season in Doxxbet liga.  At the present time season 2015–16 they are playing 3.rd Slovak League. They was 6th. in the season 2015-16. In season 2016/2017 club wins 3. Liga East. They are promoted to 2. Liga.

Crest and colours

Manufacturers and shirt sponsors
The following table shows in detail FK Slavoj Trebišov kit manufacturers and shirt sponsors by year:

Current squad 

For recent transfers, see List of Slovak football transfers winter 2022–23.

Notable players
The following players had international caps for their respective countries. Players whose name is listed in bold represented their countries while playing for Slavoj.
Past (and present) players who are the subjects of Wikipedia articles can be found here.

 Marek Čech
 Jaroslav Červeňan
 Jaroslav Kolbas
 Doriano Kortstam
 Ján Novák
 Lazaros Rota
 Dušan Sninský
 Igor Žofčák

Notable managers 

 Jozef Karel (1961-1963)
 Jozef Karel (1972-1977)
 Belo Malaga (1979-1982)
 Štefan Nadzam (1987-1989)
 Mikuláš Komanický (1993-1995)
 Vladimír Rusnák (2014)
 Martin Uporsky (2015)
 Vladimír Rusnák (July 2017 – Jam 2018)
 Karol Kisel (Jan 2018 - Oct 2018)
 Vladimír Rusnák (Oct 2018 – June 2019)
 Ľuboš Benkovský (July 2019–June 2020)
 Ondrej Desiatnik (June 2020-June 2022)
 Gergely Geri (June 2022 - Jan 2023)
 Branislav Sokoli (Jan 2023 - present)

References

External links 
Official club website 
  
  

 
Football clubs in Slovakia
Association football clubs established in 1912
1912 establishments in Slovakia